Irina Aleksandrovna Glimakova (born 17 June 1993) is a Russian former professional tennis player. and currently a professional Beach tennis player.

Tennis career

She has won three doubles titles on the ITF Women's Circuit. On 24 October 2011, she reached her best doubles ranking of world No. 491. Glimakova retirement from professional tennis in 2014. She decided to follow the Beach tennis was part of the.

Beach Tennis career
Since 2014 she is a professional Beach Tennis player.On 19 September 2016, she reached her best ranking world No. 9 ranking.

In 2019 October Glimakova partnering Daria Churakova she played for Russia in the 2019 World Beach Games in Doha (Qatar) where she won the bronze medal in women's doubles.

References

External links
 
 

Russian female tennis players
1993 births
Living people
Female tennis players playing beach tennis